Grasby (also spelled Grassby) is an English language surname of toponymic (habitation/location) origin.

Notable people with the surname include:

Marion Grasby (born 1982), Australian cook and food entrepreneur of Anglo-Celtic Australian and Thai Australian heritage. 
William Grasby (1859–1930), Australian agricultural journalist and educationist
 Al Grassby (1926–2005), Australian politician 
 Bertram Grassby (1880–1953), English silent movie actor 
 Ellnor Grassby (born 1937), Australian politician